Caila Marsai Martin (born August 14, 2004) is an American actress, best known for her role as Diane Johnson on the ABC sitcom Black-ish (2014–2022).

In 2019, Martin starred in the comedy film Little, which she also produced, becoming the youngest person ever to produce a studio film. The same year, Time magazine named her on its "Time 100 Next".

Early life 
Martin was born in Plano, Texas, to African-American parents Carol and Joshua Martin. Martin's acting career started after a glamour pictorial. The photographer gave them a discount in exchange for her father's promise that he would submit the photos to talent agencies. The photos were sent out to four agencies and one immediately signed her. At age five, she landed her first national commercial for Choice Hotel. Her family then moved to Los Angeles in 2013, so she could pursue an acting career.

Career 

In 2014, Martin was cast as Diane Johnson, the daughter of Andre (Anthony Anderson) and Rainbow Johnson (Tracee Ellis Ross) on the ABC sitcom Black-ish, created by Kenya Barris. For her breakthrough role, Martin has received numerous awards and nominations, including three NAACP Image Awards for Outstanding Supporting Actress in a Comedy Series and a Young Artist Award. She has received six NAACP Image Awards nominations and two Screen Actors Guild Award for Outstanding Performance by an Ensemble in a Comedy Series.

In 2016, Martin made her film debut, playing a leading role in the Amazon Studios original film An American Girl Story – Melody 1963: Love Has to Win, set in Detroit during the Civil Rights Movement. That same year, she did a voice role for the movie Nina, which tells the life story of American artist and activist Nina Simone. In 2019, Martin starred in her first studio feature film, the comedy Little, for Universal Pictures. At the age of 13, she became executive producer of the film, making her the youngest person to ever produce a movie, as well as the youngest African-American producer.

In February 2019, Genius Productions, Martin's company, signed a first-look production deal with Universal. Martin's first film as part of the deal is StepMonster, a comedy about a teenage girl who is adjusting to life with a new stepmother. She is the youngest person to get a first-look deal at Universal, and the youngest person to get a deal at any studio. In May 2019, it was announced Martin would be producing and starring in the film adaption of Amari and the Night Brothers for Universal Pictures. In December 2019, it was announced that Martin would be producing the comedy film Queen. She voiced the character Liberty in the 2021 film 
PAW Patrol: The Movie and the upcoming 2023 sequel film PAW Patrol: The Mighty Movie. In April 2022, it was announced that Martin would star alongside Kelly Rowland and Omari Hardwick in the upcoming film Fantasy Football.

Filmography

Film

Television

Awards and nominations

References

External links 
 

Living people
Actresses from Texas
African-American actresses
American film actresses
American television actresses
21st-century American actresses
African-American child actresses
American child actresses
African-American film producers
American women film producers
American voice actresses
21st-century African-American women
21st-century African-American people
2004 births